David Eisner (born March 3, 1958) is a Canadian actor. Best known for his recurring television role in King of Kensington and his regular roles in Hangin' In and Blue Murder, he is co-director with Avery Saltzman of the Harold Green Jewish Theatre company in Toronto.

Career 
Eisner is a two-time Gemini Award nominee for Best Actor in a Comedy Series for Hangin' In, at the 1st Gemini Awards in 1986 and the 2nd Gemini Awards in 1987. In 2005, he played Henry Morgentaler in the controversial CTV television movie Choice.

His other credits have included guest appearances in Highway to Heaven, Due South, Counterstrike, Forever Knight, Total Recall 2070, Earth: Final Conflict, This Is Wonderland, The Line, Remedy, Traders and Living in Your Car, and the CBC Radio drama series Rumours and Boarders. His film appearances include Running (1979), Phobia (1980), Happy Birthday to Me (1981), A New Life (1988), This Is My Life (1992), Trial by Jury (1994), Time to Say Goodbye? (1997), Good Will Hunting (1997), Steal This Movie! (2000) and Bless the Child (2000).

Eisner and Saltzman founded the Harold Green Jewish Theatre in 2007. With the company, he has acted in productions of David Ives' New Jerusalem and Alfred Uhry's Driving Miss Daisy.

Filmography

Film

Television

References

External links

1958 births
Canadian male television actors
Canadian male film actors
Canadian male stage actors
Canadian theatre directors
Jewish Canadian male actors
Male actors from Toronto
Living people
Canadian male radio actors